Lothair is an unincorporated community in Treutlen County, Georgia, United States. It lies along State Route 199 (SR 199) and SR 199 Spur, a short distance north of its intersection with State Route 46, to the southwest of the city of Soperton, the county seat of Treutlen County.  Its elevation is 217 feet (66 m).

References

Unincorporated communities in Treutlen County, Georgia
Unincorporated communities in Georgia (U.S. state)